Kolsuz is a mountain pass in Niğde Province, Turkey

Kolsuz is situated next to a village with the same name on the highway   connecting Niğde to the Mediterranean coast.

The north of Kolsuz pass is generally composed of high plains, typical of Central Anatolia.

References

Mountain passes of Turkey
Landforms of Niğde Province
Central Anatolia Region